Dmitri Aleksandrovich Galin (born 29 July 1989) is a former Russian professional football player.

Club career
He played 3 seasons in the Russian Football National League for PFC Spartak Nalchik and FC Baikal Irkutsk.

External links
 
 

1989 births
Living people
People from Bratsk
Russian footballers
PFC Spartak Nalchik players
FC Sakhalin Yuzhno-Sakhalinsk players
Association football midfielders
FC Baikal Irkutsk players
Sportspeople from Irkutsk Oblast